New Era Public School, is a school in  Mayapuri, New Delhi, India. It was founded in 1960 by the New Era Education Society in Delhi. The project of Mr. R.L. Chopra and Mrs. Usha Chopra came into existence in 1965.

The school is an All India Senior Secondary school, affiliated with the Central Board of Secondary Education and recognised by the Directorate of Education.

The school came into existence in one room in the year 1960.

The school organises the annual Saraswati Memorial Quiz Festival, an event involving the participation of Delhi's top schools for 16 events over a period of 3 days.
The school also holds Qriosity, a large Inter School Quiz Festival in Delhi and SYNC, an Inter School IT symposium.

The school has another branch in Pochampur, Dwarka with the same name.

Infrastructure
 Saraswati Auditorium which can seat 800 people.
 Laboratories: 
campus has three computer laboratories.
 Maths lab. 
 Three labs for Physics, Chemistry and Biology practicals, and a multipurpose lab for demonstrations for classes VI to VIII.

References

Schools in West Delhi
Schools in Delhi
1960 establishments in Delhi